The Idaho Falls City Office Building is a historic building in Idaho Falls, Idaho. It was built in 1929-1930 as a rectangular structure with "double fluted Ionic columns," reminiscent of Beaux-Arts architecture. It has been listed on the National Register of Historic Places since August 30, 1984.

References

External links

		
National Register of Historic Places in Bonneville County, Idaho
Buildings and structures completed in 1929
1929 establishments in Idaho